The 2020 Canadian Championship was the thirteenth edition of Canada's national soccer cup tournament, awarding the Voyageurs Cup. It was held as a final between one representative each from Major League Soccer and the Canadian Premier League. Before the COVID-19 pandemic, a larger knockout tournament was to be held from June 16 to September 24, 2020, between twelve teams.

The twelve teams originally planned to participate were the three MLS clubs, seven Canadian Premier League clubs, and the champions of League1 Ontario and Première ligue de soccer du Québec. The city of Ottawa had looked to be absent for the first time since 2013, with Ottawa Fury FC having suspended operations in late 2019, and Atlético Ottawa having joined the Canadian Premier League after the original draw had been finalized.

The final was held on June 4, 2022, at Tim Hortons Field in Hamilton, Ontario between hosts Forge FC and Toronto FC.

Format

Original format
The format of the competition was originally changed slightly from the 2019 edition to accommodate the departure of Ottawa Fury FC. Each round of the four-round tournament would be played in a two-legged tie format. The League1 Ontario champion Master's FA, Première ligue de soccer du Québec champion A.S. Blainville, and six CPL clubs would enter in the qualifying round in June. They would be joined by the three Major League Soccer teams and the remaining CPL club (given bye as the furthest advancing club in the 2019 Canadian Championship) in the quarter-finals in July. The semi-finals would follow in August, and the finals would be in September. Atlético Ottawa were not included in the original format because they joined the CPL after the schedule was announced.

The format was adjusted in June to exclude the League1 Ontario and Première ligue de soccer du Québec 2019 champions, who will instead qualify for the 2021 tournament. Atlético Ottawa's inclusion was also confirmed at this time.

Revised format
On August 13, 2020, the Canadian Soccer Association (CSA) announced that the tournament would consist solely of a single match final to be held between the winner of the head-to-head series between Canadian teams from Major League Soccer and the champion of the Canadian Premier League. On November 25, 2020, the CSA announced that due to pandemic-related travel restriction and scheduling conflicts, the final would be scheduled for the first quarter of 2021. During the fourth quarter of 2020, Toronto FC had been playing in the 2020 MLS Cup Playoffs in the United States, while Forge FC had been competing in the 2020 CONCACAF League across several locations in Central America and the Caribbean.

In early March 2021, several outlets reported that the final would be played on March 20, 2021. The winner of the Canadian Championship final would qualify for the 2021 CONCACAF Champions League which begins in early April 2021. Forge FC owner Bob Young raised concerns over the date of the final noting that as of March 6, 2021, his club had not yet been granted permission to train by local health authorities. On March 8, Toronto FC – who had been training as a team since February 17 – announced that several members of their team had tested positive for COVID-19 and that they had halted training.

On March 11, 2021, it was announced that the final would be postponed beyond March and that Toronto FC would automatically qualify for the Champions League. On March 2, 2022, the match was set for June 4 at Tim Hortons Field.

Qualification

Major League Soccer

As part of the MLS regular season, Canada's three Major League Soccer clubs played each other three times from August 18 to September 16. The team with the most points from this series, Toronto FC, qualified for the Canadian Championship.

Canadian Premier League

The winner of the 2020 Canadian Premier League season, Forge FC, qualified for the Canadian Championship. The season was held from August to September in three stages – a first stage, group stage, and final.

Qualified teams

Final

On March 11, 2021, it was announced that the match could not be completed in time for the start of CCL competition; a compromise was reached where Toronto FC would be named to the CCL slot, while Forge FC would be permitted to host the match once it was finally played. On March 25, 2021, Canada Soccer president Nick Bontis said that the final may end up taking place as late as July 2022. On March 2, 2022, it was announced that the final would take place on June 4, 2022 at Tim Hortons Field.

See also
2020 Canadian Premier League season

References

2020
2020 in Canadian soccer
2020 domestic association football cups
Association football events postponed due to the COVID-19 pandemic
Canadian Championship Final 2020